Sadadeen was an electoral division of the Legislative Assembly in Australia's Northern Territory. It existed from 1983 to 1990 when it was replaced by Greatorex.

Members for Sadadeen

Election results

Elections in the 1980s

References

Former electoral divisions of the Northern Territory